Lyons Groups of Galaxies (or LGG) is an astronomical catalog of nearby groups of galaxies complete to a limiting apparent magnitude B0=14.0 with a recession velocity smaller than 5,500 km/s. The catalogue was obtained from the Lyon-Meudon Extragalactic Database. Two methods were used in group construction: a percolation method derived from Huchra and Geller  and a hierarchical method initiated by R. Brent Tully. The catalog is a synthesized version of the two results.

The LGG includes 485 groups and 3,933 member galaxies.

See also 
 Abell catalogue
 New General Catalogue
 Messier Catalogue

References

External links 
 LGG description at CDS
 Full LGG list of records at CDS
 ADS: General study of group membership. II - Determination of nearby groups

Astronomical catalogues of galaxy clusters